The 61st Santosh Trophy 2006 was held from 14 September to 25 October 2006 in Gurgaon & Faridabad, Haryana.

Qualifying rounds
Venues:
 Ch. Devi Lal Sports Complex, Sector 38; Gurgaon
 HUDA Sports Complex, Sector 12; Faridabad

Cluster I - Gurgaon

14 September 2006: Haryana         3-0 Pondicherry
 [10 Habeeb Khan, 32 Sunit Mishra, 54 Praveen Arora]
16 September 2006: Bihar           1-0 Pondicherry
 [70 Niranjan Kumar Patel]
18 September 2006: Haryana         0-0 Bihar

Cluster II - Gurgaon

15 September 2006: Meghalaya       1-0 Mizoram
 [70 Rocus Lamare]
15 September 2006: Uttar Pradesh   3-0 Andaman&Nicobar Islands
 [12 Mohammed Hadi Hassan Khan, 63 Peter Siddiqui, 89 Jatin Singh Bisht]
17 September 2006: Uttar Pradesh   3-1 Mizoram
 [U: ?? Amit Singh, 76 Pralad Singh Rawat, 80 Jatin Singh Bisht; M: 48 Lalsangliana]
17 September 2006: Meghalaya       5-0 Andaman&Nicobar Islands
 [32 Roland Pyngrope, 56,67 Rocus Lamare, 80,82 Niwamo Gaiphoh]
19 September 2006: Uttar Pradesh   1-5 Meghalaya
 [U: 76 Amit Singh; M: 13,29 Newan-o-Gathpoh, 22 Marlanki Suting, 61 Romeo Sukhlein, 80 Roland Pyngrope]
19 September 2006: Mizoram         5-0 Andaman&Nicobar Islands
 [12,58 Sochungmi Releng, 25 Jerry Zirsanga, 29,63 Shylo Malswam Tulunga]

Cluster III - Faridabad

14 September 2006: West Bengal     8-1 Rajasthan
 [B: 8 Sasthi Duley, 15 Suman Datta, 26,34 Tarif Ahmed, 47,56,66,88 Vimal Pariyar; R: 42 Shakir Ahmed]
16 September 2006: Rajasthan       0-8 Madhya Pradesh
 [2,71,90+1 Rahmat Beg, 18,50 V. Shibu, 62 Praveen Nair, 73,77 Suresh Rajak]
18 September 2006: West Bengal     5-0 Madhya Pradesh
 [9 Avinash Thapa, 11,34,66 Vimal Pariyar, 45+1 Lalhmang Zuala]

Cluster IV - Faridabad

15 September 2006: Assam           5-3 Sikkim
 [A: 5,14 Robijit Jigdung, 30 Abel Sema, 38 Birjab Mushahary, 90 Akum Ao; S: 48 Bir Bahadur Pradhan, 72 Chunku Sherpa, 81 Ruben Rai]
15 September 2006: Chandigarh      1-4 Services
 [C: 89 Deepak Hooda; S: 42 MG Ramachandran, 53 N Gerneilal, 63 A Thirunavakarasu, 70 Shaji A D'Silva]
17 September 2006: Chandigarh      0-1 Assam
 [37 Bulu Jindung]
17 September 2006: Services        7-1 Sikkim
 [Se: 3,21,44 Ngurneilal, 11  Shaji D' Silva, 22 Trvdaya Raj, 39 Vivek Venu Gopal, 67 A Thirunavakarsu; Si: 53 Sanju Pradhan]
19 September 2006: Chandigarh      4-1 Sikkim
 [C: 16 Sameer Singh, 55 Bhupender Gosain, 71 Harminder Singh, 78 Karthik Bhardwaj; S: 23 Tenzing Chepel]
19 September 2006: Assam           1-1 Services
 [A: 62 Sanjiva Rongpi; S: 90+3 CT Sajith]

Cluster V - Gurgaon

22 September 2006: Manipur         3-0 Himachal Pradesh
 [14 T Narender Meetei, 31 Bungo Singh, 90+1 Bijen Singh]
22 September 2006: Chhattisgarh    1-1 Andhra Pradesh
 [C: 18 Deepangshu Mazumder; A: 43 Mohammed Quizar]
24 September 2006: Manipur         0-0 Andhra Pradesh
24 September 2006: Chhattisgarh    7-0 Himachal Pradesh
 [24 Abid Khan, 35,88 Kulwant Singh, 40 Subir Maji, 42 Tajuddin, 53,61 Ramchandra Murmu]
26 September 2006: Andhra Pradesh  4-0 Himachal Pradesh
 [26,34 Ayaz Bin Abdul Haq, 38 Syed Altafuddin Ahmed, 87 Mohammad Fareed]
26 September 2006: Manipur         0-0 Chhattisgarh

Cluster VI - Gurgaon

23 September 2006: Karnataka       0-0 Gujarat
25 September 2006: Gujarat         0-0 Nagaland
27 September 2006: Karnataka       4-0 Nagaland
 [35,53,74 Sampath Kumar Kuttimani, 57 D Raju]

Cluster VII - Faridabad

22 September 2006: Delhi           1-3 Jammu&Kashmir
 [D: 41 Trilok Singh Bisht; J: 9,44,90 Ishfaq Ahmed]
23 September 2006: Orissa          0-1 Railways
 [13 PV Vinoy]
24 September 2006: Delhi           4-2 Orissa
 [D: 18,52,76 Sunil Chetri, 69 Praveen Rawat; O: 44 Antu Murmu, 65 Manesh Mohanty]
24 September 2006: Jammu&Kashmir   0-0 Railways
26 September 2006: Orissa          0-0 Jammu&Kashmir
26 September 2006: Delhi           3-0 Railways
 [57,60,78 Sunil Chetri]

Cluster VIII - Faridabad

23 September 2006: Tamil Nadu      4-0 Tripura
 [22 J Auxiano, 47,67 Raman Vijayan, 63 Kalia Kulothungan]
23 September 2006: Jharkhand       1-1 Uttarakhand
 [J: 23 Budh Ram Soren; U: 61 Rakesh Shah]
25 September 2006: Tamil Nadu      1-0 Uttarakhand
 [56 Raman Vijayan]
25 September 2006: Jharkhand       5-1 Tripura
 [J: 5 CM Soren, 18,88 Lal Mohan Hansda, 37 Sakla Mardi, 51 Dharmendra Deogam; T: 60 Utpal Chowdhary]
27 September 2006: Tripura         2-1 Uttarakhand
 [T: 65,76 Kiran Chettri; U: 83 Rakesh Shah]
27 September 2006: Tamil Nadu      2-1 Jharkhand
 [T: 27 Kalia Kulothungan, 72 A Gestaf Antony; J: 90+2 Lal Mohan Hansda]

Pre-quarterfinal playoffs

21 September 2006: Haryana         1-0 Meghalaya
 [88 Pradeep Kumar]
21 September 2006: West Bengal     1-0 Services [extra time]
 [120 Vimal Pariyar]
29 September 2006: Chhattisgarh    3-5 Karnataka [penalties]
29 September 2006: Delhi           0-1 Tamil Nadu [extra time]

Quarterfinal League

Group B:

15 October 2006: Kerala          3-1 Tamil Nadu
 [K: 13 km Abdul Naushad, 50,78 NP Pradeep; T: 25 Kalia Kulothungan]
15 October 2006: Maharashtra     3-0 Karnataka
 [47 Adil Ansari, 64 Abhishek Yadav, 83 Paresh Shivalkar]
17 October 2006: Tamil Nadu      2-0 Karnataka
 [66 S Satish Kumar, 68 Jotin Singh]
17 October 2006: Maharashtra     1-1 Kerala
 [M: 8 Kasif Jamal; K: 29 km Abdul Naushad]
19 October 2006: Kerala          2-1 Karnataka
 [Ke: 16 KS Joby, 85 NP Pradeep; Ka: 35 Jean Christian (own Goal)]
19 October 2006: Maharashtra     1-0 Tamil Nadu
 [66 Adil Ansari]

Semi-finals
Punjab made the final of the competition by virtue of a 2–1 win over Maharashtra to regain the trophy for the first time in 20 years.

Final

References

External links
 

2006–07 in Indian football
Santosh Trophy seasons